Mount Terrible (Taungurung: Warrambat) is a  mountain within the Great Dividing Range, located to the south-west of Kevington in Victoria, Australia. The mountain is located within the  Mount Terrible Natural Features and Scenic Reserve.

Location and features

A fire lookout tower was installed in 1962 to replace the Jamieson Lookout. The hut next to the lookout tower burnt down during the night of 8–9 December 2012. Its reconstruction was approved in 2016.

The tower is utilised for communications by Telstra, Ambulance Victoria, Department of Sustainability and Environment, Victorian State Emergency Service, LSE Technology and the Upper Goulburn Repeater Association (UHF CB).

Access to the summit is via a 4 wheel drive track. The track is rocky, and may be covered by snow in the winter.

See also

Alpine National Park
List of mountains in Victoria

References

External links

Mountains of Victoria (Australia)
Victorian Alps
Mountains of Hume (region)